Chiloglanis paratus, the sawfin suckermouth, is a species of upside-down catfish native to Eswatini Mozambique, South Africa and Zimbabwe where it is found in the Pongolo, Incomati and Limpopo River systems. This species grows to a length of  SL.

References

External links 

paratus
Freshwater fish of Africa
Fish of Mozambique
Fish of South Africa
Fish of Eswatini
Fish of Zimbabwe
Taxa named by Robert S. Crass
Fish described in 1960